The Embarrass River is a  tributary of the Wolf River in the U.S. state of Wisconsin.

The Embarrass River has three branches. The  Middle Branch originates in southern Langlade County, and the  northern branch passes by Bowler, Tilleda and Leopolis. Below Pella, the Embarrass River passes by the village of Embarrass. The Embarrass River eventually flows into the Wolf River in the city of New London. "French voyageurs named this river the Embarrass, French for obstruction, because, while canoeing down the stream, they frequently found their passage blocked by fallen logs."

Sport

While frozen, the river is used for ice racing tracks in Tilleda and Caroline. The frozen river is also used for ice fishing.

References 

Rivers of Wisconsin
Rivers of Langlade County, Wisconsin
Rivers of Shawano County, Wisconsin